City Council (Former site) is a station on the Orange line of Kaohsiung MRT in Cianjin District, Kaohsiung, Taiwan.

Station overview
The station is a two-level, underground station with an island platform and four exits. The station is 206 metres long and is located at the intersection of Jhongjheng 4th Rd and Jhonghua 3rd Rd.

During the opening of the station, it was named "City Council." However, after the merging of Kaohsiung City and Kaohsiung County in 2010, the original Kaohsiung City Council was relocated to the original Kaohsiung County Council, located near Fongshan West metro station, so (Former site) was added to the end of the station name to avoid confusion. However, the name of the station still remains unchanged.

Station layout

Exits
Exit 1: Kaohsiung City Government Department of Education, Southern Taiwan Joint Services Center of the Executive Yuan 
Exit 2: Cianjin District Administrative Center, Cianjin Elementary School
Exit 3: Datong Elementary School
Exit 4: Jianguo Elementary School, Liuhe Night Market

Around the station
 Cianjin Market
 Cianjin Junior High School
 Kaohsiung City Government Police Bureau
 Kaohsiung Li De Baseball Stadium
 Kaohsiung Museum of Labor

References

2008 establishments in Taiwan
Kaohsiung Metro Orange line stations
Railway stations opened in 2008